Donglai Commandery was a historical Chinese commandery on the Jiaodong Peninsula, existing from Han dynasty to Tang dynasty.

Donglai Commandery was likely established during Emperor Jing of Han's reign on the lands of Jiaodong Commandery. In late Western Han dynasty, its territory included 17 counties and marquessates, namely Ye (掖), Chui (腄), Pingdu (平度), Huang (黃), Linqu (臨朐), Qucheng (曲成), Muping (牟平), Dongmu (東牟), Zang (脏), Yuli (育犁), Changyang (昌陽), Buye (不夜), Dangli (當利), Luxiang (盧鄉), Yangle (陽樂), Yangshi (陽石), and Xuxiang (徐鄉). In 140 AD during Eastern Han, the number of counties and marquessates was 13, including Huang, Muping, Jian (惤), Qucheng, Ye, Dangli, Dongmu, Changyang, Luxiang, Gelu (葛盧), Changguang (長廣), Qianzou (黔陬), and Buqi (不其), the last three of which were formerly part of Langya Commandery. During the Jian'an Era of early 3rd century, Qianzou was transferred to the newly established Chengyang Commandery. Also during Jian'an Era, Changguang Commandery was established on the territory of Donglai and Beihai, covering 6 counties, although by 213 AD the commandery would have been dissolved, and the counties merged back into their respective original commanderies. Changguang Commandery was later restored in 277 AD.

In 280 AD, after the unification of Jin dynasty, Donglai administered 6 counties. After the Disaster of Yongjia, the commandery was successively ruled by Later Zhao, Former Yan, Former Qin and Southern Yan, until it was conquered by Liu Yu of the Liu Song dynasty. Northern Wei conquered the region during Emperor Ming of Song's reign. The commandery was eventually abolished in early Sui dynasty.

In Sui and Tang dynasties, Donglai Commandery became the alternative name of Lai Prefecture. In 692, several counties were separated to form the new Deng Prefecture, later also known as Dongmu Commandery. In 742, the commandery's reduced territory covered 4 counties: Ye, Changyang, Jimo and Jiaoshui (膠水, formerly Changguang).

Population

References

Commanderies of the Han dynasty
Commanderies of the Jin dynasty (266–420)
Commanderies of the Southern dynasties
Commanderies of the Northern dynasties
Commanderies of the Sui dynasty